The halo is a driver crash-protection system used in open-wheel racing series, which consists of a curved bar placed to protect the driver's head.

The first tests of the halo were carried out in 2016 and in July 2017. Since the 2018 season the FIA has made the halo mandatory on every vehicle in Formula 1, Formula 2, Formula 3, Formula Regional, Formula E and also Formula 4 as a new safety measure. Some other open-wheel racing series also utilise the halo, such as IndyCar Series, Indy Lights, Super Formula, Super Formula Lights, Euroformula Open and Australian S5000. The IndyCar halo is used as a structural frame for the aeroscreen.

Construction 
The system consists of a bar that surrounds the driver's head and is connected by three points to the vehicle frame.

The system is not developed by the teams, but is manufactured by three approved external manufacturers chosen by the FIA and has the same specification for all vehicles.

In a simulation performed by the FIA, using the data of 40 real incidents, the use of the system led to a 17% theoretical increase in the survival rate of the driver.

History and development 
During development, the FIA examined three fundamental scenarios—collision between two vehicles, contact between a vehicle and the surrounding environment (such as barriers) and collisions with vehicles and debris. Tests have shown that the halo system can significantly reduce the risk of injury to the driver. In many cases the system was able to prevent the helmet from coming into contact with a barrier when checked against a series of accidents that had occurred in the past. During the study of the last case it was found that the halo was able to deflect large objects and provide greater protection against smaller debris.

In August 2017 the Dallara F2 2018, a new Formula 2 car, was presented and was the first to install the halo system. The SRT05e Formula E car presented in January 2018 had a halo. In November 2018, the 2019 FIA Formula 3 car, which was unveiled in Abu Dhabi, installed the halo too. Beginning in 2021, the Indy Lights' IL-15 began using the halo.

Alternative systems 
As an alternative to the halo system, Red Bull Advanced Technologies developed the transparent "aeroscreen". The design, which was similar to a small fairing, did not receive much interest from the FIA. After the drivers had expressed their opposition to the introduction of the halo system, the FIA developed "Shield", a transparent polyvinyl chloride screen. In 2019 the aeroscreen was adapted to use the halo as a structural frame for use in IndyCar.

Sebastian Vettel was the first and only driver to try Shield in a Formula 1 car. During the free practice for the 2017 British Grand Prix, he completed a lap with the new system before ending the test early. He complained of distorted and blurred vision that prevented him from driving. Its introduction was subsequently excluded, as there was no guarantee that the issues with Shield could be solved in time for the 2018 season.

Initial reception
The system aroused some criticism before it was involved in any incidents, including that of Niki Lauda, who claimed that the system distorted the "essence of racing cars". The system was also initially unpopular with fans, with some saying that it was visually unappealing, against the concept of open-cockpit racing, and obstructed the driver's vision. Other former drivers, including Jackie Stewart, welcomed the system and compared it to the introduction of seat belts, which had been similarly criticised, but then became the norm also on road cars. Max Verstappen made a scathing assessment of the halo in 2018, saying that it "abused the DNA" of F1, which was  "less dangerous than riding a bicycle in a city."

Incidents

Despite initial criticism, the halo was praised by the community following an incident where the halo was struck by another car—one in the Formula 2 race at Spain, where Tadasuke Makino's halo was landed on by fellow Japanese driver Nirei Fukuzumi's car, and one in the Belgian Grand Prix, where Charles Leclerc's halo was struck by Fernando Alonso's airborne McLaren, with both of their haloes showing visible damage from the impact. Both Makino and Leclerc credited the halo for possibly saving their lives, and Mercedes team principal Toto Wolff, who had criticised the halo earlier in the season, said that saving Leclerc from injury made the halo "worth it" despite its "terrible aesthetics".

The halo was credited with potentially saving the life of Alex Peroni after his vehicle became airborne and crashed during a Formula 3 event at Monza on 7 September 2019. It also played a critical role in protecting Romain Grosjean at the 2020 Bahrain Grand Prix where, after hitting Daniil Kvyat's car, he crashed into the barriers head-on. The car split the crash barrier, allowing the car to slip through in between and splitting off the back of the car from the safety cell. The halo deflected the upper section of the barrier, protecting Grosjean's head from the impact. Despite initial concern over drivers being unable to evacuate quickly due to the halo, Grosjean was able to climb out largely unassisted, despite the car catching fire upon impact with the barrier. He emerged from the flames with burns on his hands and ankles. "I wasn't for the halo some years ago, but I think it's the greatest thing that we've brought to Formula 1, and without it I wouldn't be able to speak with you today," Grosjean said. In a similar pre-halo accident at the 1974 United States Grand Prix, driver Helmuth Koinigg was decapitated. At the 2021 Italian Grand Prix, Max Verstappen and Lewis Hamilton collided. Verstappen's wheel landed on the halo protecting Hamilton's head, with Hamilton later saying it "saved my neck". At the 2022 British Grand Prix, Zhou Guanyu said the halo saved his life after his Alfa Romeo flipped over, spun and careened over the tyre barrier, because the roll hoop collapsed as soon as it hit the tarmac. Before Zhou's incident, during the Formula 2 feature race earlier in the day, the halo potentially saved the life of Roy Nissany after a collision with Dennis Hauger. Hauger's car was catapulted by a sausage kerb after being forced off the track by Nissany, then crashed on to the top of Nissany's car.

The halo also potentially saved Nyck de Vries' life after a multi-car collision in the opening lap of the first 2022 Seoul ePrix that also involved Oliver Turvey, Dan Ticktum, Oliver Askew, André Lotterer, Sébastien Buemi, Norman Nato, and Nick Cassidy. De Vries' car submarined under Buemi's car as it lost control into a wall, only for Lotterer to hit de Vries from behind, in particular due to a combination of poor track visibility and a wet road. De Vries came out unscathed, praised the halo, and commented that "I would be even smaller than I am" without it.

The halo also potentially saved the lives of Zane Maloney and Oliver Goethe during the sixth lap of the 2022 Spa-Francorchamps Formula 3 round Sprint Race. Goethe's car hit a barrier on the exit of Blanchimont, forcing his car to flip upside down and land on that of Maloney's. Both drivers were escorted out of their cars with Maloney suffering from only minor bruises on his hands.

References

External links

 
 

2018 in Formula One
Safety in auto racing
Vehicle safety technologies